Naoto T Ueno (born March 29, 1964) is a Professor of Medicine at The University of Texas MD Anderson Cancer Center; his research is in the area of inflammatory breast cancer and the molecular mechanism of metastasis and tumorigenicity.  Ueno is also affiliated with the Keio University as a visiting professor.

He is breast medical oncologist who specialized in inflammatory breast cancer, triple negative breast cancer, and metastatic breast cancer. He is best known for his preclinical development of  E1A gene therapy and multiple preclinical development which led to novel clinical trials related to inflammatory breast cancer and triple negative breast cancer.

He is well known for both his passion and commitment in cancer research and for compassion to take care of advanced breast cancer. He is currently studying cancer metastasis, MAPK/EGFR pathways, and cancer microenvironment. He is the executive director of the Morgan Welch Inflammatory Breast Cancer Program and Clinic and Section Chief of the Translational Breast Cancer Research at Department of Breast Medical Oncology.

He has been invited to talk about patient empowerment in Tokyo TEDx in 2011.

Awards 
1995-1996	Clinical Fellow Research Award, MD Anderson Cancer Center
1996 	        Cancer Research Achievement Award, MD Anderson Cancer Center
1996 	        Houston Endowment, Jesse H. Jones Fellowship in Cancer Education
1996 	        Outstanding Achievement in Cancer Research Award, Pharmacia and Upjohn
1998	                American Association Cancer Research-Glaxo Wellcome Oncology Clinical Research Scholar Award for Promising Translation or Clinical Research, Glaxo Wellcome
2008 	        6th Robert M. Chamberlain Distinguished Mentor Award Nomination (Top Three Finalist), MD Anderson
2011	                Amgen Basic Research Award, 2nd Prize for Mentoring, MDACC
2013	                Regent's Outstanding Teaching Award, University of Texas
2013	                Bradley Stuart Beller Special Merit ASCO Merit Award for Hiroko Masusda, MD, PhD (Mentee)
2018                    Rune for the Cure Foundation. Unknown Hero Award.

References 

21st-century American biologists
Living people
1964 births
University of Texas MD Anderson Cancer Center faculty